Alexander Charles Luis "Aly" Borromeo (born 28 June 1983) is a former American-born Filipino footballer who played as a defender. He is currently a team manager for Kaya-Iloilo and was a long-time captain of the Philippines national team.

Club career
Borromeo joined Kaya in 1999, and has been the captain of the first team for several years during his tenure. He went on a loan to Global during the 2010–11 season and led the club to be the champions of the 2010 UFL Cup during that season.

On October 15, 2011, in his first match for Kaya in the 2011 UFL Cup against Diliman, Borromeo incurred an ACL injury, which sidelined him for the club and the national team.  After almost seven months, he made his return for the 2012 League season on May 12, 2012 as a substitute against Loyola Meralco Sparks, which ended a 2–2 draw. In the following match against Global F.C. on May 16, 2012, he scored an equalizer in second half injury time to end in a 1–1 draw.

He was dropped from the Kaya lineup for the 2012–13 season due to a meniscus injury, in which he acquired while training for the national team in mid-2012.

Borromeo's recurring injury since 2011 made him consider retirement but eventually recovered to return playing with Kaya. He played for Kaya at the 2016 AFC Cup and was a starter and captain for the team's first match against Hong Kongese side Kitchee. He was still playing for Kaya when the club joined the Philippines Football League in 2017 as Kaya–Makati (and later as Kaya–Iloilo). His return stint to Kaya as a player was brief but he remained with the club after he was appointed as its team manager.

International career
Borromeo first represented the Philippines at under-19 level during the 2000 AFC Youth Championship qualifiers and was also a goalkeeper at that time. Four years later, he made his full international debut at the 2004 Tiger Cup, playing in all four matches. Playing as a striker, he assisted two goals by Emelio Caligdong to give the Philippines their first ever win in the competition, defeating newly-independent Timor-Leste 2–1.

He also represented the Philippines at under-23 level. At the 2005 Southeast Asian Games on home soil, serving as captain, he scored in a 4–2 win against Cambodia as the Philippines failed to progress to the knockout stage.

Personal
Borromeo is the biological son of prominent Australian businessman Marcus Blackmore. He did not meet his father until he was 27. One of his step-sisters is fashion designer Imogen Merrony.

See also
Road To Rio

References

External links

Aly Borromeo profile at Kaya FC

1983 births
Living people
Filipino footballers
Philippines international footballers
Association football defenders
Soccer players from San Francisco
Citizens of the Philippines through descent
American sportspeople of Filipino descent
Kaya F.C. players
Global Makati F.C. players